Bonifatius Fischer (1915–1997) was a German biblical scholar, textual critic of the Vulgate, and Benedictine.

Fischer questioned Jerome's authorship of some parts of the Vulgate New Testament.

In 1951-1954 Fischer prepared the Old-Latin text of the Book of Genesis:
 Genesis 1:1 – 9:14 (1951)
 Genesis 9:14 – 27:23 (1952)
 Genesis 27:23 – 43:22 (1953)
 Genesis 43:22 – 50:26 (1954).

Fischer examined all known Latin manuscripts of the Gospels written before the 10th century. Fischer participated in preparation of Vulgata Stuttgartiana.

Works 

 Novae Concordantiae Bibliorum Sacrorum Iuxta Vulgatam Versionem Critice Editam, 1977, 
 Beiträge Zur Geschichte Der Lateinischen Bibeltexte
 Lateinische Bibelhandschriften Im Frühen Mittelalter

References 

1915 births
1997 deaths
German biblical scholars
Roman Catholic biblical scholars
20th-century German Catholic theologians
German Benedictines
Benedictine theologians
German male non-fiction writers
20th-century German Roman Catholic priests